Ryan Reid may refer to:

 Ryan Reid (basketball) (born 1986), American-Jamaican basketball player
 Ryan Reid (baseball) (born 1985), American baseball pitcher

See also
 Ryan Reed (born 1993), American stock car race driver
 Reid Ryan (born 1971), American baseball executive